Londiani is a Kenyan town in the Kericho County. As of 2009, it had a total population of 44,953.

Transport 
Londiani is located in the Kipkelion East Constituency between Nakuru and Kericho, off total-kericho highway off Nakuru-Eldoret highway about one hour drive from Nakuru town. Junction londiani to Moroni Road

Statistics 
 Elevation = 2325m

References 

Kericho County